Lanois is a surname.  Notable people with the surname include:

 Bob Lanois, Canadian sound engineer, music producer, and harmonica player
 Daniel Lanois, Canadian record producer and singer-songwriter
 Jocelyne Lanois, Canadian musician, bass player, and songwriter

de:Lanois